The Golden League is a high school athletic conference in Los Angeles County, California affiliated with the CIF Southern Section.  All the current schools are part of the Antelope Valley Union High School District.

Schools
As of 2014, the schools in the league are:
Antelope Valley High School
Eastside High School	
Highland High School
Knight High School
Lancaster High School
Littlerock High School
Palmdale High School
Quartz Hill High School

References

CIF Southern Section leagues